Luis Mariano Torresi (born 26 January 1981, in Mendoza) is an Argentine footballer who plays as a midfielder. He currently plays for Atlético Uruguay.

External links
 Statistics at BDFA 
 
 

1981 births
Living people
Sportspeople from Mendoza, Argentina
Argentine footballers
Argentine expatriate footballers
Godoy Cruz Antonio Tomba footballers
San Martín de San Juan footballers
Apollon Limassol FC players
Instituto footballers
Club Libertad footballers
Argentine Primera División players
Cypriot First Division players
Association football midfielders
Expatriate footballers in Cyprus
Expatriate footballers in Mexico
Expatriate footballers in Paraguay